Braxton Family Values is an American reality television series that airs on WE tv and premiered on April 12, 2011. It chronicles the lives of Braxton sisters — Toni, Tamar, Traci, Towanda, and Trina — plus their mother, Evelyn.

Series overview

Episodes

Season 1 (2011)

Season 2 (2011–12)

Season 3 (2013–14)

Season 4 (2014–15)

Season 5 (2016–17)

Season 6 (2018–19)

Season 7 (2020)

References

External links

 
 
 

Lists of American non-fiction television series episodes
Lists of reality television series episodes